Cyprinodon is a genus of pupfishes found in waters that range from fresh to hypersaline. The genus is primarily found in Mexico, the Caribbean Islands and southern United States (Arizona, California, Florida, Nevada, New Mexico, Oklahoma and Texas), but C. variegatus  occurs as far north as Massachusetts and along the entire Gulf of Mexico coastline, and C. dearborni  and C. variegatus are found in northern South America. Many species have tiny ranges and are highly threatened, in some cases already extinct. Cyprinodon are small; the largest reaches  in length and most other species only reach about half that size.

Distribution and habitat

A few Cyprinodon species have quite large ranges, notably C. variegatus, but the vast majority have small ranges, typically restricted to one or two Mexican states or US states, Hispaniola, or a Bahaman island. While most Cyprinodon species have separate distributions, seven (C. beltrani, C. esconditus, C. labiosus, C. maya, C. simus, C. suavium and C. verecundus) are endemic in Lake Chichancanab in Quintana Roo, Mexico, and three (the endemic C. brontotheroides and C. desquamator, and the widespread C. variegatus) live in the hypersaline lakes on San Salvador Island in the Bahamas. In a few other cases separate species do come into contact towards the edges of their distributions where they often hybridize, notably C. eximius X C. pachycephalus  and C. atrorus X C. bifasciatus, but also C. variegatus in places where it has been introduced by humans into the ranges of other Cyprinodon species.

Although the individual Cyprinodon species often have a highly specific habitat, overall the genus occurs in a remarkably range of places, such as springs (including those isolated in deserts), pools, lakes, coastal lagoons, creeks, streams and rivers. Certain species may even experience very large variations in the temperature and salinity over a relatively short period. Furthermore, the salinity of C. salinus''' habitat may vary from less than one-third of that of sea water to almost five times as much as sea water in a season.

Conservation status
Most species in the genus are seriously threatened. C. arcuatus, C. ceciliae, C. inmemoriam, C. nevadensis calidae and an undescribed species popularly known as the "Perrito de Sandia" are already extinct. C. arcuatus was restricted to springs in the US state of Arizona and probably also in the Mexican state of Sonora, while all the others were restricted to spring systems in Mexico.

Three species from southwestern Nuevo León, C. alvarezi, C. longidorsalis and C. veronicae, have become extinct in the wild, only surviving in captivity. A few other Mexican species still considered endangered or vulnerable by the IUCN, including at least C. maya, C. simus and C. verecundus of Lake Chichancanab, also appear to only survive in captivity. Several others have very small remaining populations in the wild. Among the species that survive in the wild, the rarest is perhaps C. diabolis from the tiny Devils Hole in Nevada; in recent decades its population has fluctuated between a few tens and a few hundred individuals. Primary threats to pupfish are habitat loss due to water extraction, drought and pollution, and introduced species.

Behavior
Feeding

Most Cyprinodon species feed on algae, cyanobacteria and detritus, but may also supplement their diet with small crustaceans and aquatic insect larvae. Some species mainly feed on small animals like aquatic insects. C. variegatus, a species that otherwise has a diet typical of pupfish, will clean other fish by feeding on parasites on their body.

In the two places where several species live together they have diverged into different niches, including the fish-eating C. maya (Lake Chichancanab), zooplankton-eating C. simus (Lake Chichancanab), amphipod- and bivalve-eating C. labiosus and C. verecundus (Lake Chichancanab), scale-eating C. desquamator (San Salvador Island lakes), and ostracod- and gastropod-eating C. brontotheroides (San Salvador Island lakes).

BreedingCyprinodon pupfish are short-lived, typically reaching an age of no more than a year in the wild, although some may reach as much as three years. Especially those from habitats that experience major environmental fluctuations (for example, large variations in temperature) rapidly reach maturity and are already able to breed when 1–1.5 month old. Despite some species' ability to survive in a wide temperature range, their requirements for breeding often are much more specific. Consequently, pupfish living in stable habitats breed year-round, but those in more seasonal habitats generally only at certain times of the year where the conditions are optimal. When breeding, males assume a relatively bright nuptial coloration.

There are two primary breeding strategies: In species of small isolated habitats like springs, each large male (or medium-sized male, if large males are absent) defends a territory and displays to visiting females that will lay their eggs inside the territory. In at least some species, small males will attempt to fertilize eggs by sneaking into a territory of a larger male. Once deposited, neither sex cares for the eggs, although they do get a level of protection by being inside the territory of a male. A male will attempt to attract several females to lay their eggs in his territory and a female may lay eggs in the territories of several males. Another breeding strategy is used by species that inhabit rivers. Here the males do not maintain a territory and groups of pupfish gather to breed. A male typically will lead a female to the edge of the group to spawn, although on occasion it may occur in the middle of the group. The eggs of Cyprinodon pupfish are adhesive and stick to the substrate, or they are covered in sand.

Species

There are currently 49 recognized species in this genus:
 Cyprinodon albivelis W. L. Minckley & R. R. Miller, 2002 (Whitefin pupfish)
 Cyprinodon alvarezi R. R. Miller, 1976 (Potosi pupfish)
 †Cyprinodon arcuatus W. L. Minckley & R. R. Miller, 2002 (Santa Cruz pupfish)
 Cyprinodon artifrons C. L. Hubbs, 1936 (Yucatán pupfish)
 Cyprinodon atrorus R. R. Miller, 1968 (Bolson pupfish)
 Cyprinodon beltrani Álvarez, 1949 (Blackfin pupfish)
 Cyprinodon bifasciatus R. R. Miller, 1968 (Cuatro Cienegas pupfish)
 Cyprinodon bobmilleri Lozano-Vilano & Contreras-Balderas, 1999 (San Ignacio pupfish)
 Cyprinodon bondi G. S. Myers, 1935 (Hispaniola pupfish)
 Cyprinodon bovinus S. F. Baird & Girard, 1853 (Leon Springs pupfish)
 Cyprinodon brontotheroides C. H. Martin & Wainwright, 2013 (Durophage pupfish)
 †Cyprinodon ceciliae Lozano-Vilano & Contreras-Balderas, 1993 (Villa Lopez pupfish)
 Cyprinodon dearborni Meek, 1909
 Cyprinodon desquamator C. H. Martin & Wainwright, 2013 (Scale-eating pupfish)
 Cyprinodon diabolis Wales, 1930 (Devil's Hole pupfish)
 Cyprinodon elegans S. F. Baird & Girard, 1853 (Comanche Springs pupfish)
 Cyprinodon eremus R. R. Miller & Fuiman, 1987 (Sonoyta pupfish)
 Cyprinodon esconditus Strecker, 2002 (Hidden pupfish)
 Cyprinodon eximius Girard, 1859 (Conchos pupfish)
 Cyprinodon fontinalis M. L. Smith & R. R. Miller, 1980 (Carbonera pupfish)
 Cyprinodon higuey C. M. Rodriguez & M. L. Smith, 1990 (Black-and-blue Pupfish)
 Cyprinodon hubbsi Carr, 1936 (Lake Eustis minnow)
 †Cyprinodon inmemoriam Lozano-Vilano & Contreras-Balderas, 1993 (Charco Azul pupfish)
 Cyprinodon julimes De la Maza-Benignos & Vela-Valladares, 2009 (Julimes pupfish)
 Cyprinodon labiosus Humphries & R. R. Miller, 1981 (Thicklip pupfish)
 Cyprinodon laciniatus C. L. Hubbs & R. R. Miller, 1942 (Bahama pupfish)
 Cyprinodon latifasciatus Garman, 1881 (Parras pupfish) 
 Cyprinodon longidorsalis Lozano-Vilano & Contreras-Balderas, 1993 (La Palma pupfish)
 Cyprinodon macrolepis R. R. Miller, 1976 (Largescale pupfish)
 Cyprinodon macularius S. F. Baird & Girard, 1853 (Desert pupfish)
 Cyprinodon maya Humphries & R. R. Miller, 1981 (Maya pupfish)
 Cyprinodon meeki R. R. Miller, 1976 (Mezquital pupfish)
 Cyprinodon nazas R. R. Miller, 1976 (Nazas pupfish)
 Cyprinodon nevadensis C. H. Eigenmann & R. S. Eigenmann, 1889
 Cyprinodon nevadensis amargosae R. R. Miller, 1948 (Amargosa River pupfish)
 †Cyprinodon nevadensis calidae R. R. Miller, 1948 (Tecopa pupfish)
 Cyprinodon nevadensis mionectes R. R. Miller, 1948 (Ash Meadows pupfish)
 Cyprinodon nevadensis nevadensis C. H. Eigenmann & R. S. Eigenmann, 1889 (Amargosa pupfish)
 Cyprinodon nevadensis pectoralis R. R. Miller, 1948 (Warm Springs pupfish)
 Cyprinodon nevadensis shoshone R. R. Miller, 1948 (Shoshone pupfish)
 Cyprinodon nichollsi M. L. Smith, 1989 (Jaragua pupfish)
 Cyprinodon pachycephalus W. L. Minckley & C. O. Minckley, 1986 (Bighead pupfish)
 Cyprinodon pecosensis A. A. Echelle & A. F. Echelle, 1978 (Pecos pupfish)
 Cyprinodon pisteri R. R. Miller & W. L. Minckley, 2002 (Palomas pupfish)
 Cyprinodon radiosus R. R. Miller, 1948 (Owens pupfish)
 Cyprinodon riverendi (Poey, 1860) (synonym: Cyprinodon jamaicensis, Fowler, 1939)
 Cyprinodon rubrofluviatilis Fowler, 1916 (Red River pupfish)
 Cyprinodon salinus R. R. Miller, 1943
 Cyprinodon salinus milleri LaBounty & Deacon, 1972 (Cottonball marsh pupfish)
 Cyprinodon salinus salinus R. R. Miller, 1943 (Death Valley pupfish, Salt Creek pupfish)
 Cyprinodon salvadori Lozano-Vilano, 2002 (Bocochi pupfish)
 Cyprinodon simus Humphries & R. R. Miller, 1981 (Boxer pupfish)
 Cyprinodon suavium Strecker, 2005
 Cyprinodon tularosa R. R. Miller & A. A. Echelle, 1975 (White Sands pupfish)
 Cyprinodon variegatus (Lacépède, 1803)
 Cyprinodon variegatus baconi Breder, 1932
 Cyprinodon variegatus ovinus (Mitchill, 1815)
 Cyprinodon variegatus variegatus (Lacépède, 1803) (Sheepshead minnow)
 Cyprinodon verecundus Humphries, 1984 (Largefin pupfish)
 Cyprinodon veronicae'' Lozano-Vilano & Contreras-Balderas, 1993 (Charco Palma pupfish)

References 

 
Cyprinodontidae
Ovoviviparous fish
Freshwater fish genera
Taxa named by Bernard Germain de Lacépède